is a former professional sumo wrestler, who was active from 1989 until 1990. The highest rank he reached was jonidan 89. He was the first, and so far only, professional sumo wrestler from the United Kingdom.

Career 
A former photographic printer from Edgware, London, he was inspired to join sumo after seeing broadcasts on Channel 4. After months of training in martial arts techniques with Syd Hoare of the British Sumo Association, he went to Japan and joined the Azumazeki stable run by former sekiwake Takamiyama, who had already taken on a number of foreign recruits from Hawaii. Strange had written a number of letters to Azumazeki Oyakata asking to join.  
The name Hidenokuni was chosen to acknowledge his pioneering status as the first ever rikishi from the United Kingdom: the first and last characters of Hidenokuni together mean England.  Hajime is a common given name in Japan, and can be taken to mean start or beginning. He found it difficult to adjust to the sumo diet of chankonabe and instead of gaining weight, he lost  in his first two months in Japan.

Hidenokuni's sumo career was short. After coming though maezumō (pre-sumo) in September 1989, he fought his first tournament in the bottom jonokuchi division in November 1989. In his second ever bout he fought future Yokozuna Musashimaru, who had joined sumo at the same time as him. Recording a 5-2 score, Hidenokuni had performed sufficiently well to be promoted to jonidan for the January 1990 tournament.  He celebrated by going out to a disco with ōzeki Konishiki, who had just won the top division title. He again achieved kachi-koshi in January, meaning he had won 12 of his first 18 bouts. He had gained quite a lot of attention due to his status as the first ever European in sumo, and even started to receive fan mail. However, he also received very harsh treatment in training from his stablemates, who were not pleased at the attention he was getting,  and this influenced his decision to return to England. He quit immediately after the March 1990 tournament, although he remained on the banzuke for the next tournament in May.

Career record

See also
Glossary of sumo terms
List of non-Japanese sumo wrestlers
List of past sumo wrestlers

References

External links
 Hidenokuni

1971 births
Living people
English sumo wrestlers
Sportspeople from London